Rupanjit Singh Bal (born January 26, 1990) is an Indian-Canadian YouTuber, actor, director and comedian. Bal became famous for his comedic roles in videos produced by fellow Indo-Canadian comic and YouTuber Jus Reign, and parleyed that role into further acting work. He made his film debut as the main actor in the Punjabi film Haani. He has directed many music videos for Karan Aujla.

Early life 
Rupanjit Singh Bal was born on January 26, 1990, in Amritsar, Punjab, India, into a Punjabi Jatt Sikh family of the Bal clan. He and his family moved to Canada from India when he was starting grade 10. He was raised in Brampton, Ontario. He received his earlier education from the Spring Dale School Amritsar and Turner Fenton Secondary School in Brampton and graduated from the University of Guelph, where he finished his degree in Criminology.

Career 
Bal was originally going to attend York University but changed schools last minute. While attending University of Guelph, Bal met fellow Indo-Canadian comedian, Jus Reign and was invited to be in one of his YouTube videos. That first video was A-1 Shopping Cart Driving School, and Bal impressed Jus Reign enough to be invited for a larger role in another video Desi Parents. This was the first video where Bal appeared in character as Jus Reign's fictional mother. After two years of creating YouTube videos, Bal became an official YouTube Partner and began earning money from his videos.

His YouTube fame got noticed by Punjabi music legend and actor Harbhajan Mann, who offered him a role in his Punjabi film Haani. In a candid podcast interview with Amin Dhillon, Bal describes the moment he got the phone call from Mann. Originally Bal thought he was being pranked and hung up on the Mann. The transition from YouTube comedian to actor was difficult for Bal. He wasn't a trained actor and had never been on a film set before. Bal credits that film with giving him his acting training and he went on to star in his next Punjabi film 22 g Tussi Ghaint Ho.

Bal also appeared in a few music videos, including Mickey Singh's Body. Nowadays he is working as a video director in Punjabi music industry and owns Rupan Bal Films company. He has made videos of famous artists such as Karan Aujla, Deep Jandu, Bohemia and Jazzy B.

In 2017, he directed an MC SKULE educational music video, The F Word: Feminism.

Filmography

As producer

Selected music videos

References 

1990 births
Living people
Punjabi people
Indian emigrants to Canada
Canadian people of Indian descent
Canadian people of Punjabi descent
Canadian male actors of Indian descent
Indian Sikhs
Canadian Sikhs
University of Guelph alumni
People from Chandigarh
Comedians from Ontario